The 2022 NCAA National Collegiate Women's Ice Hockey Tournament was a single-elimination tournament by eleven schools to determine the national champion of women's NCAA Division I college ice hockey. This was the first year the tournament featured an expanded field of 11 teams. The first round and quarterfinals were played on at the campuses of seeded teams on March 10 and 12, 2022, while the Frozen Four was played on March 18 and 20, 2022 at Pegula Ice Arena in University Park, Pennsylvania. Ohio State won the tournament with a 3–2 win over Minnesota-Duluth making it their first national championship.

Qualifying teams 
In the first year under this qualification format, the winners of all four Division I conference tournaments received automatic berths to the NCAA tournament. The other seven teams were selected at-large. The top five teams were then seeded.

Bracket 

Note: each * denotes one overtime period

Results

First round

Quinnipiac vs. Syracuse

Wisconsin vs. Clarkson

Minnesota-Duluth vs. Harvard

National quarterfinals

Wisconsin vs. (3) Northeastern

(5) Yale vs. (4) Colgate

Minnesota-Duluth vs. (2) Minnesota

Quinnipiac vs. (1) Ohio State

National semifinals

Minnesota-Duluth vs. (3) Northeastern

(5) Yale vs. (1) Ohio State

National championship

Minnesota-Duluth vs. (1) Ohio State

Media

Television 
ESPN had US television rights to the semifinals and national championship after entering into a multi-year contract to carry the event. The Quarterfinals were streamed on ESPN+, CollegeSportsLive, and BigTen+. ESPN+ carried the Frozen Four and the Championship, while ESPNU also carried the Championship.

Broadcast assignments 
Women's Frozen Four and Championship
 Clay Matvick, AJ Mleczko, and Hilary Knight.

See also 
 NCAA Women's Ice Hockey Tournament
 2022 NCAA Division I Men's Ice Hockey Tournament

References 

NCAA Women's Ice Hockey Tournament
1